Richard Hoover Lyford (born 7 October 1917; died November 4, 1985, North Hollywood, Los Angeles) was an American filmmaker.

He directed avant-garde films in Seattle, Washington in his early career, including As the Earth Turns. During the 1940s, he found success working with Walt Disney.

In 1950, he co-directed and edited The Titan: Story of Michelangelo which won an Academy Award for documentary feature in 1950 and was preserved by the Academy Film Archive in 2005. In 1951, he moved to Saudi Arabia to produce a documentary on the history of the Arab people. In 1956, this documentary was shown on the national TV and around the world called Island of Allah.

In 1969, Richard Lyford returned to the Persian Gulf to produce a 93-minute movie about a young Arab pearl diver called Hamad and the Pirates which came out in 1971.

References 

American filmmakers
1917 births
1985 deaths